The Socialist Youth of Germany – The Falcons (SJD – Die Falken) is a voluntary organisation of children and young people. Like Jusos, the youth organisation of the Social Democratic Party of Germany (SPD), The Falcons are member of the International Union of Socialist Youth and Young European Socialists. The Falcons are also a member of the International Falcon Movement.

As a political organisation with a history of over 90 years, the falcons organise camps and other spare time activities to encourage children and young people for more democracy, social justice, equality and a substantial change in society.

References

External links
 
 

Youth wings of political parties in Germany
Youth wings of social democratic parties
International Falcon Movement – Socialist Educational International